The 2003 Eastern Illinois Panthers represented Eastern Illinois University as a member of the Ohio Valley Conference (OVC) during the 2003 NCAA Division I-AA football season. Led by 17th-year head coach Bob Spoo, the Panthers compiled an overall record of 4–8 with a mark of 3–5 in conference play, tying for sixth place in the OVC.

Schedule

References

Eastern Illinois
Eastern Illinois Panthers football seasons
Eastern Illinois Panthers football